GEF or Gef may refer to:

 Gef, a supposed talking mongoose from the Isle of Man
 Global Enrichment Foundation, a Canadian humanitarian organization
 Global Environment Facility, an intergovernmental environmental organizations
 Global Equality Fund, of the United States Department of State
 Green European Foundation, a European political foundation
 Graphical Editing Framework, a software framework
 Greek Expeditionary Force (Korea), during the Korean War
 Greif, Inc., an American manufacturing company
 Guanine nucleotide exchange factor